U with tilde (У̃ у̃; italics: У̃ у̃) is a letter of the Cyrillic script.

U with tilde is used in the Khinalug language where it represents a nasalized close back rounded vowel /ũ/.

See also
Ũ ũ : Latin letter Ũ
Cyrillic characters in Unicode

References

Cyrillic letters with diacritics
Letters with tilde